Manuel Rolando Iturra Urrutia (born 23 June 1984) is a Chilean former professional footballer who played as a defensive midfielder, currently a youth manager at Universidad de Chile.

Club career

U. Chile and Leiria
Born in Temuco, Iturra made his Primera División debut with Club Universidad de Chile in 2003, aged 19. He proceeded to be a first-team regular from his second season onwards, helping La U to the 2004 and 2009 Apertura tournaments.

In January 2011, Iturra was loaned to U.D. Leiria in Portugal, first appearing in the Primeira Liga on 12 February when he played the full 90 minutes in a 1–0 away win against C.D. Nacional. He started in all but one of the league matches he featured in for the club, as it eventually finished in tenth position.

Spain
For 2011–12, Iturra joined Real Murcia of the Spanish Segunda División. After featuring heavily during the campaign he returned to Universidad, where he had his contract terminated.

On 28 August 2012, free agent Iturra became the first summer signing of Málaga CF, as a direct replacement for Enzo Maresca who had moved to U.C. Sampdoria a few days before. He made his official debut on 18 September in the club's first-ever UEFA Champions League group stage match, coming on as a half-time substitute for Francisco Portillo in a 3–0 home victory over FC Zenit Saint Petersburg.

Iturra scored his first goal for Málaga on 16 January 2013, profiting from a defensive scramble to put the visitors ahead at the Camp Nou against FC Barcelona, in an eventual 2–2 draw in the Copa del Rey (6–4 aggregate loss). He finished his first season at La Rosaleda Stadium with 39 appearances in all competitions, helping to a sixth-place finish in the league.

From 2013 to 2015, Iturra represented Granada CF also in La Liga after signing a three-year contract. He made his competitive debut for his new team on 18 August, featuring 90 minutes in a 2–1 win at CA Osasuna.

Udinese
On 23 July 2015, Iturra joined Udinese Calcio, which like Granada was also owned by Italian businessman Giampaolo Pozzo. His maiden Serie A match was on 23 August, and he played the entire 1–0 away defeat of Juventus FC.

Iturra signed a six-month loan deal with Rayo Vallecano on 30 January 2016. He made just four starts during his brief stay.

Later years
On 4 June 2016, Iturra left Europe agreeing to a contract with Mexico's Club Necaxa. He returned to Spain two years later, joining Villarreal CF for free and leaving the club by mutual consent on 2 January 2019.

In July 2021, Iturra was appointed youth manager of UD San Pedro, a small club in the Province of Málaga.

In the 2021–2022 season, Iturra played for Atlético Marbellí in the Segunda Andaluza Málaga, making 7 appearances.

International career
Iturra made his debut for Chile on 17 August 2005, against Peru. On 24 May of the following year, he scored the game's only goal in a friendly with the Republic of Ireland.

Iturra represented the nation at the 2007 Copa América in Venezuela, helping the side to the quarter-finals.

International goals

Coaching career
In 2021, he began his career as coach of UD San Pedro Juvenil A team. In 2022, he joined Universidad de Chile youth system, being confirmed for the 2023 season.

Honours
Universidad de Chile
Primera División de Chile: 2004 Apertura, 2009 Clausura

References

External links

1984 births
Living people
People from Temuco
Chilean people of Basque descent
Chilean footballers
Association football midfielders
Chilean Primera División players
Universidad de Chile footballers
Deportes Iquique footballers
Primeira Liga players
U.D. Leiria players
La Liga players
Segunda División players
Real Murcia players
Málaga CF players
Granada CF footballers
Rayo Vallecano players
Villarreal CF players
Serie A players
Udinese Calcio players
Liga MX players
Club Necaxa footballers
Israeli Premier League players
Maccabi Haifa F.C. players
Chile international footballers
2007 Copa América players
Chilean expatriate footballers
Expatriate footballers in Portugal
Expatriate footballers in Spain
Expatriate footballers in Italy
Expatriate footballers in Mexico
Expatriate footballers in Israel
Chilean expatriate sportspeople in Portugal
Chilean expatriate sportspeople in Spain
Chilean expatriate sportspeople in Italy
Chilean expatriate sportspeople in Mexico
Chilean expatriate sportspeople in Israel
Chilean football managers
Chilean expatriate football managers
Expatriate football managers in Spain